Strawberries (Fragaria species) are used as food plants by the larvae of a number of Lepidoptera species including:

Angle shades (Phlogophora meticulosa)
Brown-tail (Euproctis chrysorrhoea)
Common marbled carpet (Chloroclysta truncata)
Common swift (Korscheltellus lupulina)
Emperor moth (Pavonia pavonia)
Ghost moth (Hepialus humuli)
Grizzled skipper (Pyrgus malvae) - recorded on F. vesca
Heart and dart (Agrotis exclamationis)
Hypercompe indecisa
Juniper pug (Eupithecia pusillata)
Large yellow underwing (Noctua pronuba)
Lesser yellow underwing (Noctua comes)
Mouse moth (Amphipyra tragopoginis)
Oberthür's grizzled skipper (Pyrgus armoricanus)
Turnip moth (Agrotis segetum)

External links

Strawberry
Lepidoptera